Skellerup is a New Zealand-based manufacturer of industrial and agricultural rubber products. Skellerup may also refer to:

Places
Skellerup, Denmark, village
Skellerup Glacier, glacier in Oates Land, Antarctica

See also
Skjellerup, Danish surname